Dancing on a Cold Wind is a 1974 album by flamenco-rock band Carmen. It was later released on a double CD set with the band's previous album, Fandangos in Space.

Trivia
The cover is a mock-up of the logo for Gitanes brand cigarette designed by Ken Hilton of the House of Wizzard design studio.

Track listing

Personnel
Carmen
 David Allen - vocals, electric guitar, flamenco guitar
 Angela Allen - vocals, synthesizer, Mellotron
 Roberto Amaral - vocals, vibraphone, castanets
 John Glascock - vocals, bass guitar
 David Katz - violin
 Paul Fenton - drums, percussion

Additional Musicians
 Mary Hopkin - backing vocals
 Chris Karan - additional percussion
 Tony Visconti - woodwind and string arrangements
 Danny Thompson - double bass

References

External links
CARMEN Discography

1974 albums
Carmen (band) albums
Albums produced by Tony Visconti